The Old Chicago Main Post Office Twin Towers was a proposed mixed use supertall skyscraper planned as part of the canceled Old Chicago Main Post Office Redevelopment project in the Chicago Loop community area. Had it been built according to plan, the building would have been the tallest in the United States.

Details
In 2009, British real estate developer Bill Davies bought Chicago's Old Main Post Office for $24 million and in March 2011, he bought an adjacent property for $14 million. On July 21, 2011, Davies announced his plans for the Twin Towers within the Old Chicago Main Post Office Redevelopment. Davies' plans were filed by his company, International Property Developers. A previous  building plan for the Chicago Spire stalled during the Great Recession. The plan was approved on July 18, 2013.

Joseph Antunovich was the architect. If built as planned, the  building, which was intended as the second of three phases of the overall project, would have been the tallest in North America. The building was also intended to support revenue-generating communications antennas and to host commercial, hotel and residential facilities.

According to the New York Times, critics of the project noted potential problems with the proposed towers' proximity to the extant Sears Tower. For example, the heights of the residential accommodations in the planned building would have placed residents within the radiation impact zone from the antennas atop the Sears Tower. Also, there was a claim that the air convection surrounding the two buildings would create a vacuum.

In October 2014, Davies' joint venture for redevelopment with Sterling Bay was dissolved. In December 2014, Davies canceled the project and put the post office building up for sale.

Notes

Condo hotels in the United States
Hotels in Chicago
Proposed buildings and structures in Illinois
Proposed skyscrapers in the United States
Residential condominiums in Chicago
Residential skyscrapers in Chicago
Skyscraper hotels in Chicago
Unbuilt buildings and structures in the United States